Bellspool is a village in the Scottish Borders area of Scotland, near to Drumelzier, Hopcarton and Kingledoors

See also
List of places in the Scottish Borders
List of places in Scotland

External links
RCAHMS entry for Bellspool and Bellspool Garden Cottage
RCAHMS/Canmore entry for Bellspool, Bellspool Cottages
Borders Family History Society: Drumelzier

Villages in the Scottish Borders